Sandra Frei (born 6 August 1984) is a snowboarder who represented Switzerland at the 2010 Winter Olympics in the snowboard cross event, where she placed 11th. She also competed at the World Snowboard Championships in 2007 and 2009.

Frei retired in July 2011.

References

External links 
 
 
 

1984 births
Living people
Swiss female snowboarders
Olympic snowboarders of Switzerland
Snowboarders at the 2010 Winter Olympics
X Games athletes
21st-century Swiss women